Smiling Pasta is a romantic-comedy Taiwanese drama starring Cyndi Wang and Nicholas Teo. It was adapted into manhua by Yu Jia Yan.

Synopsis
A young couple, not knowing each other in the past, collided with each other and created boundless rumors and a romance full of interest. Cheng Xiao-Shi is an innocent and honest common young girl, whereas He Qun-Gui is the new super star of singing circle, and the oldest son, out of two, of present speaker of a legislative body. These two parallel lines meet occasionally in the street. He was eluding from paparazzi at that time, but collided with her accidentally, after she was just dumped by her boy friend. The fierce collision made his lips pressed on hers by accident. It was such a nice chance for the paparazzo, and he shot this valuable moment with his camera. He Qun had no choice but to take her and escape.

Story
The story begins with 20-year-old Xiao Shi (Cyndi Wang) day dreaming on her balcony, wishing upon a shooting star for a successful love. In her dazed state, she accidentally knocks her mug over the edge, which then lands and bounces off the front of the famous singer He Qun's (Nicolas Teo) sportscar, when he happened to be driving past. Even though they didn't meet, this marks the beginning of their intertwined destinies.

The next morning, Xiao Shi's flamboyant but nonetheless supportive family, conducts a good luck ceremony for Xiao Shi, to celebrate her three months together with her current boyfriend, Peter. Xiao Shi was cursed with relationships not exceeding three months by her first crush Ah Zhe (Gino Tsai). Despite the curse, Xiao Shi has a great feeling about her third month anniversary with Peter, recalling Peter telling her that he will introduce her to the most important woman in his life. Thinking that he means his mother, Xiao Shi is so confident that everything will go well, even making a bet with her brother that she can bring Peter home that night

Enjoying her date, everything appears to be progressing smoothly for Xiao Shi. Peter suddenly brings her right into the centre of a cross section and Xiao Shi assumes that he is going to confess his undying love for her. However, his real intention is to break up with her, claiming that she's 'not his style' and pointing to the scantily clad girl across the street (his new girlfriend) who is his style. Xiao Shi is devastated and a dark cloud looms over her head (literally).

Hanging her head in defeat, Xiao Shi wanders through the streets until a stranger bumped into a her. This stranger happens to be the 22-year-old in disguise, He Qun, who's just run away from his own press conference and in the process of fleeing the paparazzi. The clumsy encounter leaves the both of them in a compromising position in the middle of the streets, allowing the paparazzi to obtain a few shots of the both of them "kissing".

He Qun, accustomed to this kind of thing, being a celebrity, recognizes trouble when he sees it, so he runs for his life dragging Xiao Shi with him as to protect him from the idea of two-timing his ex-girlfriend, Rita, who had broken up with him for his brother just hours before. Through a series of mishaps, tossed in with a bit of fate, He Qun ends up providing refuge for Xiao Shi in his own bedroom, for the night.

Unbeknown  to them, the newspapers have been working overtime, and by morning, the image of them kissing in the streets cover the front page of every tabloid. The dreary and clueless pair step out onto the balcony, where the waiting reporters are virtually fed evidence of their affair. To protect He Qun's career, his agent Vincent has no choice but to introduce Xiao Shi as He Qun's fiancée.

As the series continues, it is shown that Ah Zhe is He Qun's younger brother. Ah Zhe's girlfriend Xiao Rou, through an unfortunate accident, was unintentionally killed by He Qun. Ah Zhe, unable to forgive or trust He Qun, leaves his family and severed ties with his brother.

From this point on, Xiao Shi's world is turned upside down. She is still wondering if there is anyway that she can break away from the love-curse. Meanwhile, the poor little rich boy, He Qun, gradually discovers that the love and warmth he's never known, can be brought about by the simplest things (or people), as he continues to visit Xiao Shi and her family at their family restaurant.

Xiao Shi, initially in love with He Qun's younger brother, Ah Zhe, who so happened to save her life, finds herself with mixed feelings for He Qun. Meanwhile, He Qun finds himself falling for Xiao Shi. However, he denies his feelings for her and leads Xiao Shi to believe that he is still in love with Rita.

In the end, after a turn of events and when the two publicly declare their love for one another, He Qun and Xiao Shi finally get together with He Qun proposing to Xiao Shi.

Cast
Cyndi Wang (王心凌) as Cheng Xiao Shi/成曉詩
Nicholas Teo (張棟樑) as He Qun/何群
Gino Tsai as Ah Zhe/阿哲 or He Rui Zhe/何瑞哲
Joyce Chao (趙虹喬) as Rita
Zhao Shun (趙舜) as Cheng Jin/成金
Jian Chang (檢場) as Cheng Gang/成剛
Wang Juan (王娟) as Chen Lin Ma Li/成林瑪麗
Hu Kang Xing (胡康星) as Cheng Ming/成銘
Song Zhi Ai as Huang Qian Hui/黃千慧
Wu Zhen Ya (吳震亞) as Lei Long/雷龍
Shen Meng-sheng (沈孟生) as He Meng Yuan/何孟元
Bao Zheng Fang (鲍正芳) as Bi Li Ling/毕丽铃
Di Zhi Jie (狄志杰) as Vincent
Wei Ru (薇如) as Xiao Rou/筱柔
Darren Chiang as Wei Zai
Leon Jay Williams as himself (Episode 15 cameo)

Soundtrack

Smiling Pasta Original TV Soundtrack (微笑PASTA 電視原聲帶) was released on July 14, 2006 by Various Artists under EMI (Taiwan). It contains fourteen songs, in which five songs are various instrumental versions of the original songs. The opening theme song is "Cǎi Hóng De Wēi Xiào" or "Rainbow's Smile" by Cyndi Wang, while the ending theme song is by Nicholas Teo entitled "Běi Jí Xīng De Yǎn Lèi" or "Tears from Polaris".

Track listing

References

External links
 TTV Official Homepage
 SETTV Official Homepage
 Smiling Pasta Reviews at spcnet.tv

Taiwanese drama television series
Taiwan Television original programming
Sanlih E-Television original programming
2006 Taiwanese television series debuts
2006 Taiwanese television series endings